Substances, mixtures and exposure circumstances in this list have been classified by the International Agency for Research on Cancer (IARC) as group 2B: The agent (mixture) is "possibly carcinogenic to humans". The exposure circumstance entails exposures that are possibly carcinogenic to humans. This category is used for agents, mixtures and exposure circumstances for which there is limited evidence of carcinogenicity in humans and less than sufficient evidence of carcinogenicity in experimental animals. It may also be used when there is inadequate evidence of carcinogenicity in humans but there is sufficient evidence of carcinogenicity in experimental animals. In some instances, an agent, mixture or exposure circumstance for which there is inadequate evidence of carcinogenicity in humans but limited evidence of carcinogenicity in experimental animals together with supporting evidence from other relevant data may be placed in this group. 
Further details can be found in the preamble to the IARC Monographs.

Agents and groups of agents

A
A-α-C (2-Amino-9H-pyrido[2,3-b]indole)
Acetaldehyde
Acetamide
Acrylonitrile
AF-2 (2-(2-Furyl)-3-(5-nitro-2-furyl)acrylamide)
Aflatoxin M1
1-Amino-2,4-dibromoanthraquinone
para-Aminoazobenzene
ortho-Aminoazotoluene
2-Amino-5-(5-nitro-2-furyl)-1,3,4-thiadiazole
Amsacrine
ortho-Anisidine
Anthraquinone
Antimony trioxide
Aramite
Auramine
Azaserine
Aziridine

B
Benz[j]aceanthrylene
Benz[a]anthracene
Benzo[b]fluoranthene
Benzo[j]fluoranthene
Benzo[k]fluoranthene
Benzo[c]phenanthrene
Benzophenone
Benzofuran
Benzyl violet 4B
2,2-Bis(bromomethyl)propane-1,3-diol
BK polyomavirus (BKV)
Bleomycin
Bracken fern
Bromochloroacetic acid
Bromodichloromethane
1-Bromopropane
Butylated hydroxyanisole
β-Butyrolactone

C
Caffeic acid
Carbazole
Carbon black
Carbon nanotubes, multi-walled MWCNT-7
Carbon tetrachloride
Catechol
Chlordane
Chlordecone (Kepone)
Chlorendic acid
para-Chloroaniline
3-Chloro-4-(dichloromethyl)-5-hydroxy-2(5H)-furanone
Chloroform
1-Chloro-2-methylpropene
3-Chloro-2-methylpropene, technical grade
Chlorophenoxy herbicides
4-Chloro-ortho-phenylenediamine
Chloroprene
Chlorothalonil
Chrysene
CI Acid Red 114
CI Basic Red 9
CI Direct Blue 15
Citrus Red No. 2
Cobalt and cobalt compounds 
Cobalt sulfate and other soluble cobalt(II) salts
Coconut oil diethanolamine condensate
para-Cresidine
Cumene
Cycasin

D
2,4-D (2,4-dichlorophenoxyacetic acid)
Dacarbazine
Dantron (Chrysazin, 1,8-Dihydroxyanthraquinone)
Daunomycin
DDT (p,p'''-DDT)
N,N'-Diacetylbenzidine
2,4-Diaminoanisole
4,4'-Diaminodiphenyl ether
2,4-Diaminotoluene
Dibenz[a,h]acridine
Dibenz[c,h]acridine
7H-Dibenzo[c,g]carbazole
Dibenzo[a,e]pyrene
Dibenzo[a,h]pyrene
Dibenzo[a,i]pyrene
Dibromoacetic acid
Dibromoacetonitrile
1,2-Dibromo-3-chloropropane
2,3-Dibromopropan-1-ol
Dichloroacetic acid
para-Dichlorobenzene
3,3'-Dichlorobenzidine
3,3'-Dichloro-4,4'-diaminodiphenyl ether
1,2-Dichloroethane
1,3-Dichloropropene (technical grade)
1,3-Dichloro-2-propanol
Dichlorvos
Diethanolamine
Di(2-ethylhexyl)phthalate
1,2-Diethylhydrazine
Diglycidyl resorcinol ether
Digoxin
Dihydrosafrole
Diisopropyl sulfate
3,3'-Dimethoxybenzidine (o-Dianisidine)
para-Dimethylaminoazobenzenetrans-2-[(Dimethylamino)methylimino]-5-[2-(5-nitro-2-furyl)-vinyl]-1,3,4-oxadiazole
2,6-Xylidine (2,6-Dimethylaniline)
Dimethylarsinic acid
3,3'-Dimethylbenzidine (o-Tolidine)
1,1-Dimethylhydrazine
Dimethyl-p-toluidine
3,7-Dinitrofluoranthene
3,9-Dinitrofluoranthene
1,3-Dinitropyrene
1,6-Dinitropyrene
1,8-Dinitropyrene
2,4-Dinitrotoluene
2,6-Dinitrotoluene
1,4-Dioxane
Disperse Blue 1

E
1,2-Epoxybutane
Ethyl acrylate
Ethylbenzene
Ethylene dichloride
Ethyl methanesulfonate

F
Foreign bodies, implanted in tissues
Polymeric, prepared as thin smooth films (with the exception of poly(glycolic acid))
Metallic, prepared as thin smooth films
Metallic cobalt, metallic nickel and an alloy powder containing 66-67% nickel, 13-16% chromium and 7% iron
2-(2-Formylhydrazino)-4-(5-nitro-2-furyl)thiazole
Fumonisin B1
Furan

GGinkgo biloba extract
Glu-P-1 (2-Amino-6-methyldipyrido[1,2-a:3',2'-d]imidazole)
Glu-P-2 (2-Aminodipyrido[1,2-a:3',2'-d]imidazole)
Glycidaldehyde
Griseofulvin

H
HC Blue No. 1
Heptachlor
Hexachlorobenzene
Hexachloroethane
Hexachlorocyclohexanes
Hexamethylphosphoramide (HMPA)
2,4-Hexadienal
Human immunodeficiency virus type 2 (infection with)
Human papillomavirus types 26, 53, 66, 67, 70, 73, 82
Human papillomavirus types 30, 34, 69, 85, 97
Human papillomavirus types 5 and 8 (in patients with epidermodysplasia verruciformis)
Hydrochlorothiazide
1-Hydroxyanthraquinone

I
Indeno[1,2,3-cd]pyrene
Indium tin oxide
Iron-dextran complex
Isoprene

J
JC polyomavirus (JCV)

K
Kava extract

L
Lasiocarpine
Lead

M
Magnetic fields (extremely low frequency)
MeA-α-C (2-Amino-3-methyl-9H-pyrido[2,3-b]indole)
Medroxyprogesterone acetate
MeIQ (2-Amino-3,4-dimethylimidazo[4,5-f]quinoline)
MeIQx (2-Amino-3,8-dimethylimidazo[4,5-f]quinoxaline)
Melamine
Merphalan
Methylarsonic acid
2-Methylaziridine (Propyleneimine)
Methylazoxymethanol acetate
5-Methylchrysene
4,4'-Methylene bis(2-methylaniline)
4,4'-Methylenedianiline
Methyleugenol
2-Methylimidazole
4-Methylimidazole
Methyl isobutyl ketone
Methylmercury compounds 
2-Methyl-1-nitroanthraquinone (uncertain purity)
N-Methyl-N-nitrosourethane
Methylthiouracil
α-Methylstyrene
Metronidazole
Michler's base (4,4'-methylene-bis(N,N-dimethyl)benzenamine)
Michler's ketone (4,4'-bis(dimethylamino)benzophenone)
Microcystin-LR
Mirex
Mitomycin C
Mitoxantrone
Molybdenum trioxide
3-Monochloro-1,2-propanediol (3-MCPD)
Monocrotaline
5-(Morpholinomethyl)-3-[(5-nitrofurfurylidene)amino]-2-oxazolidinone
β-Myrcene

N
Nafenopin
Naphthalene
Nickel, metallic and alloys
Niridazole
Nitrilotriacetic acid and its salts 
5-Nitroacenaphthene
2-Nitroanisole
3-Nitrobenzanthrone
Nitrobenzene
Nitrofen (technical-grade)
2-Nitrofluorene
1-[(5-Nitrofurfurylidene)amino]-2-imidazolidinoneN-[4-(5-Nitro-2-furyl)-2-thiazolyl]acetamide
Nitrogen mustard N-oxide
Nitromethane
2-Nitropropane
4-Nitropyrene
N-Nitrosodi-n-butylamine
N-Nitrosodiethanolamine
N-Nitrosodi-n-propylamine
3-(N-Nitrosomethylamino)propionitrile
N-Nitrosomethylethylamine
N-Nitrosomethylvinylamine
N-Nitrosomorpholine
N-Nitrosopiperidine
N-Nitrosopyrrolidine
N-Nitrososarcosine

O
Ochratoxin A
Oil Orange SS
Oxazepam

P
Palygorskite (attapulgite)  (long fibres, >5 µm)
Panfuran S (containing dihydroxymethylfuratrizine)
Parathion
Pentosan polysulfate sodium
Perfluorooctanoic acid
Phenazopyridine hydrochloride
Phenobarbital
Phenolphthalein
Phenoxybenzamine hydrochloride
Phenyl glycidyl ether
Phenytoin
PhIP (2-amino-1-methyl-6-phenylimidazo(4,5-b)pyridine)
Polychlorophenols and their sodium salts (mixed exposures)
Ponceau MX
Ponceau 3R
Potassium bromate
Primidone
Progestins
Progestogen-only contraceptives
β-Propiolactone
Propylene oxide
Propylthiouracil
Pulegone
Pyridine

Q
Quinoline

R
Radiofrequency electromagnetic fields, such as, but not limited to, those associated with wireless phones
Refractory ceramic fibres
Riddelliine

S
SafroleSchistosoma japonicum (infection with)
Silicon carbide, fibrous
Sodium ortho-phenylphenate
Special-purpose fibres such as E-glass and '475' glass fibres
Sterigmatocystin
Streptozotocin
Sulfasalazine
Sulfallate

T
1,1,1,2-Tetrachloroethane
1,1,2,2-Tetrachloroethane
Tetrachlorvinphos
Tetrahydrofuran
Tetranitromethane
Thioacetamide
4,4'-Thiodianiline
2-Thiouracil
Titanium dioxide
Toluene diisocyanates
Toxaphene (Polychlorinated camphenes)
Triamterene
Trichlormethine (Trimustine hydrochloride)
Trichloroacetic acid
2,4,6-Trichlorophenol
Trp-P-1 (3-Amino-1,4-dimethyl-5H-pyrido[4,3-b]indole)
Trp-P-2 (3-Amino-1-methyl-5H-pyrido[4,3-b]indole)
Trypan blue

U
Uracil mustard

V
Vanadium pentoxide
Vinyl acetate
4-Vinylcyclohexene
4-Vinylcyclohexene diepoxide

Z
Zalcitabine
Zidovudine (AZT)

MixturesAloe vera, whole leaf extract
Bitumens, occupational exposure to straight-run bitumens and their emissions during road paving
Bitumens, occupational exposure to hard bitumens and their emissions during mastic asphalt work
Carrageenan, degraded (Poligeenan)
Chlorinated paraffins of average carbon chain length C12 and average degree of chlorination approximately 60%
Diesel fuel, marine
Engine exhaust, gasoline
Fuel oils, residual (heavy)Fusarium moniliforme'', toxins derived from (fumonisin B1, fumonisin B2, and fusarin C)
Gasoline
Goldenseal root powder
Magenta dyes (CI Basic Red and fuchins)
Pickled vegetables (traditional in Asia)
Toxaphene (Polychlorinated camphenes)
Welding fumes

Exposure circumstances
Carpentry and joinery
Cobalt metal without tungsten carbide
Dry cleaning (occupational exposures in)
Firefighter (occupational exposure as)
Printing processes (occupational exposures in)
Talc-based body powder (perineal use of)
Textile manufacturing industry (work in)

Notes
 Evaluated as a group.

References

External links

 Description of the list of classifications, IARC
 List of Classifications (latest version)

 List of Classifications by cancer sites with sufficient or limited evidence in humans, Volumes 1 to 124 (Last update: 8 July 2019)

 

ja:IARC発がん性リスク一覧